Porto de Pedras is a municipality located in the northern coast of the Brazilian state of Alagoas. Its population was 7,701 in 2020. Its area is 266 km².

Climate

References

Populated coastal places in Alagoas
Municipalities in Alagoas